Asuman Basalirwa (born November 17, 1977) is a Ugandan politician and member of the 11th parliament representing Bugiri Municipality. He was first elected to the parliament in 2018 on the ticket of Justice Forum (JEEMA).

Education 
Basalirwa earned his First School Leaving Certificate from Mwiri Primary School in 1991, and Uganda Certificate of Education (UCE), 1996 and Uganda Advanced Certificate of Education (UACE) from Kiira College Butiki in 1998. He holds a Diploma in Legal Practice from the Law Development Centre (LDC) Kampala, Uganda in 2004. In 2008, he finished from Pretoria University with a Certificate in International Humanitarian Law and a Master of Laws from Makerere University in 2015. He’s a Lawyer/Partner at Sewankambo & Co. Advocates.

Political career 
Basalirwa is the president of Justice Forum (JEEMA) from 2010 to date. He is the Chairperson of the Inter-Party Organisation on Dialogue (IPOD). He was elected to the parliament in 2018 and was re-elected in the 2021 general election to represent Bugiri Municipality. He serves as the Deputy Chairperson of the Public Accounts Committee (PAC) of Parliament.

References 

Living people
1977 births
21st-century Ugandan politicians
University of Pretoria alumni
Makerere University alumni
Members of the Parliament of Uganda